Corre or Corré is a surname. Notable people with the surname include:

Joseph Corré, British businessman best known for co-founding the British Lingerie company Agent Provocateur in 1994
Sadie Corré, 4'2" English actress, tap dancer, comic performer and leading pantomime cat
Corentin Corre, Breton cyclist
Jean-Claude Corre (born 1961), French race walker
Jean-Marie Corre (1864–1915), French bicycle and automobile manufacturer

Breton-language surnames